Black Rain is a 1989 American neo-noir action thriller film directed by Ridley Scott and written by Craig Bolotin and Warren Lewis. It stars Michael Douglas, Andy García, Ken Takakura, and Kate Capshaw and features Yūsaku Matsuda (in his final film role before his death that year) and Shigeru Kōyama. The film focuses on two NYPD officers who arrest a member of the Yakuza and must escort him back to Japan. Once there, he escapes, and the two officers find themselves dragged deeper and deeper into the Japanese underworld.

Black Rain was released by Paramount Pictures on September 22, 1989. It received much publicity beforehand as it was Douglas's first film in two years and the first since his Oscar winning role in the film Wall Street.  Upon release, the film received generally mixed to positive reviews from critics, which praised the performances, action sequences, Hans Zimmer's musical score, direction and editing but criticized the screenwriting, clichéd story and lack of character development.  In the years since, the film has become a major cult film and has been widely praised.

Black Rain was also a huge box office hit with grossing over $134 million worldwide in front of a production budget of $30 million, and was nominated for two Academy Awards: Best Sound and Best Sound Editing.

Plot
Nick Conklin is a New York City police officer facing possible criminal charges. Internal Affairs believes Nick was involved with his former partner, who was caught skimming from money logged in as evidence against some drug dealers. Nick, who has financial difficulties, is divorced from his wife, who has custody of their two sons.

While having lunch, Nick and his current partner, Charlie Vincent, observe two Japanese men meeting with Mafia gangsters. Another Japanese man, Sato, enters the restaurant, seizes a small package at gunpoint, kills the Japanese customers, and leaves. Nick and Charlie chase and arrest Sato after he nearly kills Nick. Japanese officials demand Sato be extradited to Osaka and given to the police there. Though angered that he will not be prosecuted in the US, Nick agrees to escort him. Nick's captain believes it will keep Nick from causing more trouble and exacerbating the already biased Internal Affairs investigation.
	
Nick and Charlie fly to Osaka and surrender Sato to men dressed as Japanese police. They quickly realize that the men were impostors, but Sato and the men flee the airport before they can be recaptured. Nick and Charlie convince the real Osaka police to allow them to observe the investigation, though their weapons are confiscated. They are assigned to Assistant Inspector Masahiro Matsumoto. Nick behaves rudely and offends Matsumoto, while Charlie attempts to be more diplomatic. Nick also makes contact with Joyce, a Caucasian nightclub hostess originally from Chicago, who explains that he and Charlie represent American inefficiency and stupidity to the Japanese. Through her, Nick learns that Sato is fighting a gang war with a notorious crime boss, Sugai, and traveled to New York to disrupt Sugai's counterfeiting scheme.

Nick joins a police raid without permission and takes a few $100 bills from the crime scene. The next day, Matsumoto explains they have dishonored themselves, him, and the police force by his theft, which has been reported in America. Nick calls him a snitch and demonstrates to him and the Chief Inspector that the money is counterfeit. That night, Nick and Charlie walk back to their hotel drunk and unescorted, despite warnings about their safety. In an apparent prank, a young motorcyclist steals Charlie's coat and leads him to an underground parking garage. The motorcyclist turns out to be one of Sato's henchmen. Separated from Charlie, Nick watches in horror as Sato and several others briefly torture Charlie before Sato beheads him. Joyce comforts the distraught Nick at her apartment. Later, Matsumoto hands him Charlie's service revolver.

As Matsumoto and Nick trail one of Sato's operatives, Nick admits he stole money in New York. The operative retrieves a sample counterfeit note, which she passes to a gangster. Nick and Matsumoto tail him to a steel foundry, where they find Sato meeting Sugai, and the package from New York is a printing plate for American $100 bills. Nick confronts Sato, who escapes when swarming police arrest Nick for waving a gun in public and arrange for him to be deported. Nick sneaks off the plane to pursue Sato on his own as Matsumoto has been suspended and demoted. Joyce helps him meet Sugai, who explains that making counterfeit US currency is his revenge for the "black rain", or nuclear fallout, after the bombing of Hiroshima. Nick suggests a deal where Sugai can use Nick to retrieve the stolen plate from Sato, leaving Sugai's reputation and hands clean.

Sugai drops Nick at a remote farm with a shotgun. Matsumoto arrives, and they deduce that Sato is planning a massacre. During a meeting with Sugai, Sato cuts off one of his fingers in atonement, stabs Sugai, and escapes with the plates, prompting a gunfight between Sugai's and Sato's men. Sato escapes the fight on a dirt bike, Nick pursues him, and the two fight briefly. Nick gains the advantage and, having Sato at his mercy, has the choice of whether or not to kill Sato for Charlie and all the humiliation he has suffered. Matsumoto and Nick walk a handcuffed Sato into police headquarters to the amazement of everyone and later receive commendations, which Nick accepts gratefully.

Before Nick boards his flight home, Matsumoto remarks that the printing plates were not recovered, and Nick seems to imply that he took them. Nick thanks Matsumoto for his assistance and friendship and gives him a dress shirt in a gift box. Underneath it, Matsumoto finds the plates.

Cast
 Michael Douglas as Detective Nick Conklin
 Andy García as Detective Charlie Vincent
 Ken Takakura as Assistant Inspector Masahiro "Mas" Matsumoto
 Kate Capshaw as Joyce
 Yūsaku Matsuda as Sato Koji
 Shigeru Kōyama as Chief Inspector Ohashi
 John Spencer as Captain Oliver
 Guts Ishimatsu as Katayama
 Yuya Uchida as Nashida
 Tomisaburo Wakayama as Sugai Kunio
 Miyuki Ono as Miyuki
 Luis Guzman as Frankie
 Stephen Root as IA Detective Berg
 Richard Riehle as IA Detective Crown
 Clem Caserta as Abolofia
 Vondie Curtis-Hall as Detective
 Professor Toru Tanaka as Sugai's Bodyguard
 Mak Takano as Tattooed Yakuza (uncredited)
 Nathan Jung as Sato's Enforcer (uncredited)
 Al Leong as Sato's Assassin (uncredited)
 Bruce Locke as Sato's Bodyguard (uncredited)

Hong Kong actor Jackie Chan was originally approached to play the role of Sato, but instead turned it down as he felt audiences did not want to see him play a "bad" character.  Harrison Ford and Kurt Russell were strongly considered for the role of Nick Conklin, before Michael Douglas was cast due to his favorable relationship with producers Sherry Lansing and Stanley R. Jaffe.

Production
Director Paul Verhoeven was originally attached to direct, but, after a slow development process, left to helm Total Recall (1990). He would later collaborate with Douglas on Basic Instinct (1992).

The film began shooting in November 1988 and ended in March 1989. Japanese actor Yūsaku Matsuda, who played Sato, died of bladder cancer shortly after the film's completion. Director Ridley Scott dedicated the film to his memory.

The high cost and red tape involved in filming in Japan prompted director Scott to declare that he would never film in that country again. Scott was eventually forced to leave the country and complete the final climactic scene (which included American character actor Al Leong) in Napa Valley, California.

This film marks the first collaboration between Hans Zimmer and Ridley Scott. He would go on to score several more films for Scott, including Thelma and Louise, Hannibal, Gladiator, Black Hawk Down and Matchstick Men.

Japanese musician Ryuichi Sakamoto contributed the song "Laser Man" to the film's soundtrack.

Locations

Large parts of Black Rain were filmed in Osaka, although some of the locations have changed somewhat since the late 1980s when production took place. The original intention of Ridley Scott was to film in the Kabukicho nightlife district of Shinjuku, Tokyo. However, the Osaka authorities were more receptive towards film permits so the similarly futuristic neon-infused Dōtonbori in Namba was chosen as the principal filming location in Japan.

An aerial shot of Osaka bay at sunset with the estuaries of the Yodogawa, Kanzakigawa and Ajigawa rivers frames the opening sequence of the arrival into Japan.

The main filming location in Osaka is by the Ebisubashi bridge. The futurist Kirin Plaza building (architect Shin Takamatsu, built 1987), the Ebisubashi and the famous neon wall overlooking the Dōtonbori canal creates the Blade Runner-esque mise-en-scène.

Umeda, Osaka's northern centre, is represented by the first floor shopping mall concourse of Hankyu Umeda station Terminal Building. Resembling a futuristic neo-gothic nave from a cathedral, this is where Charlie Vincent's (Andy Garcia) jacket is stolen by a bosozoku biker. Because the production could not finish the segment in Japan, Charlie's demise, the subsequent escalator chase and car park scenes, replete with appropriate Japanese signs, were shot in downtown Los Angeles.

The now removed Shinsaibashi bridge (dismantled in 1995), Osaka Municipal Central Wholesale Market, Nippon Steel Works in Sakai City (south Osaka), Kyobashi, the elevated Hanshin Expressway, Osaka Castle and Nanko Port Town also feature briefly, as well as the Motomachi shopping district of neighbouring Kobe.

In New York City, the 1964 World Expo's Unisphere opens the film, followed by Nick Conklin (Michael Douglas) riding over the Queensboro Bridge. The illegal bike race between Nick and an anonymous challenger took place from underneath the west underside of the Brooklyn Bridge north to the Manhattan Bridge.

The house of the mob chief is Frank Lloyd Wright’s famous Ennis House, 2607 Glendower Avenue, Los Feliz, on the slopes below the Griffith Park Observatory. It had already been used by Ridley Scott as Deckard’s apartment block in Blade Runner.

The climactic motorbike chase sequence was shot in the Napa Valley region of Northern California.

Music
The soundtrack had various artists with the score composed by Hans Zimmer. The soundtrack was originally released as a 7-track album in 1989 by Virgin Movie Music on cassette, vinyl and compact disc. However, it was re-released in 2012 by La-La Land Records in limited edition as a two-disc package.

Release
Black Rain was released in the United States on September 22, 1989, and in the Philippines on February 1, 1990. It was screened as the opening film at the 3rd Tokyo International Film Festival in October 1989 and shown as the Special Invitational Screening film. Ken Takakura attended the event. It was later screened at the Golden Horse Film Festival in Taipei.

Home Media
Black Rain was first released in the U.S. on Blu-ray Special Collector's Edition in 2007 by Paramount Pictures with six extra features including audio commentary by director Ridley Scott, a two-part "Making of Black Rain" documentary, a 20-minute featurette about the script and cast and a 12-minute segment looking at the post-production. It was first released in the UK in 2008. The same edition was re-released by Warner Bros. in 2013.

Reception

Box office
In its opening weekend, Black Rain grossed $9.6 million in 1,610 theaters in the United States and Canada, ranking #1 at the box office. It stayed at the #1 spot for two more weeks. At the Japanese box office, Black Rain was the fifth top-grossing  foreign film of 1989, earning  in distributor rentals. The film grossed a total of $46.2 million in the United States and Canada, and $88 million in other territories, for a worldwide gross of $134.2 million.

Critical response
Vincent Canby of The New York Times wrote that the film "plays as if it had been written in the course of production. There seems to have been more desperation off the screen than ever gets into the movie. As bad movies go, however, the American 'Black Rain' is easy to sit through, mostly because of the way Mr. Scott and his production associates capture the singular look of contemporary urban Japan." Roger Ebert gave the film two stars out of four and stated, "Even given all of its inconsistencies, implausibilities and recycled cliches, Black Rain might have been entertaining if the filmmakers had found the right note for the material. But this is a designer movie, all look and no heart, and the Douglas character is curiously unsympathetic." Gene Siskel of the Chicago Tribune awarded the same two-star grade and wrote, "The crosscultural action picture might have worked if the filmmakers had come up with a script in which Douglas' character had been rendered weak and confused by being a fish trying to swim in strange waters. But instead he is presented as a traditional action hero dominating everyone in sight. The cultural imperialism of that decision makes for a routine and frequently offensive story full of Asian stereotypes."

A review in Variety stated, "Since this is a Ridley Scott film, 'Black Rain' is about 90% atmosphere and 10% story. But what atmosphere! This gripping crime thriller about hardboiled N.Y. cop Michael Douglas tracking a yakuza hood in Osaka, Japan, boasts magnificent lensing by Jan DeBont and powerfully baroque production design by Norris Spencer." Michael Wilmington of the Los Angeles Times described the plot as "standard '80s schtick" but called the visuals "hellaciously gorgeous" and concluded that "action movies are one genre where clichés can be transcended and execution can triumph over content. That's what happens here." Rita Kempley of The Washington Post wrote that Scott "approaches this prickly action thriller with the gusto of a sushi chef in a fish storm. Unfortunately and typically, he loses sight of his story in this artistic barrage of blood and guts. It's a gorgeous, erratic movie most definitely not for those with an aversion to cutlery."

The film holds a 54% rating on Rotten Tomatoes based on 24 reviews with the consensus: "Black Rain has its fair share of Ridley Scott's directorial flair, but its paint-by-numbers story never rises above genre conventions." On Metacritic it has a score of 56% based on reviews from 18 critics.

In retrospect, Michael Douglas said: "It was hard to know who to root for. And people here were uncomfortable with race stuff and talking about the bomb. There was a critic, who'll remain nameless, who called it a racist film. I called him up and asked, "Have you ever been to Japan?". He said, "No", and I said, "Then what the hell are you talking about?". The Japanese loved it. I loved it—I thought it rocked from top to bottom."

During an interview on the podcast WTF with Marc Maron in November 2021, Scott called the film "f*cking great".

Black Rain was nominated for the Academy Awards for Best Sound (Donald O. Mitchell, Kevin O'Connell, Greg P. Russell and Keith A. Wester) and Best Sound Effects Editing. (Milton Burrow and William Manger)

References

Further reading
 An academic comparative study of Black Rain (American film) and Black Rain (Japanese film), entitled "Nuclear Bomb Films in Japan and America: Two Black Rain Films" by Yoko Ima-Izumi included in Essays on British and American Literature and Culture: From Perspectives of Transpacific American Studies edited by Tatsushi Narita (Nagoya: Kougaku Shuppan, 2007)

External links

 
 
 

1989 films
1989 action thriller films
1980s chase films
American action thriller films
Films directed by Ridley Scott
Films scored by Hans Zimmer
Films set in New York City
Films set in Osaka
Films shot in California
Films shot in Los Angeles
Films shot in New York City
Films shot in Osaka
Georges Delerue Award winners
1980s Japanese-language films
Japan in non-Japanese culture
Films about the American Mafia
American neo-noir films
Paramount Pictures films
American police detective films
Yakuza films
1980s English-language films
1980s American films
American buddy cop films
Films about the New York City Police Department